The Redcliffe Shot Tower was a historic shot tower in the English city of Bristol. It was the progenitor of many similar towers built around the world. The tower stood at the corner of Redcliffe Hill and Redcliffe Parade,  in the suburb of Redcliffe, between the years of 1782 and 1968.

In 1775, William Watts, a plumber, started converting his house, near St Mary Redcliffe Church, into the world's first shot tower, in order to make lead shot by his innovative tower process. By 1782, the tower was complete and in production, and Watts was granted a patent on his process, which involved pouring molten lead through a perforated zinc pan into water below.

William Watts was declared bankrupt in 1794, but his tower survived various changes of ownership until it was taken over by the Sheldon Bush and Patent Shot Company Limited in 1868. The tower remained a well-known feature of Redcliffe until 1968, when it was demolished to make way for road improvements. The Sheldon Bush and Patent Shot Company's shot manufacture was transferred to the new  Cheese Lane Shot Tower on the banks of the Floating Harbour.

References

External links
Photograph of the tower in 1904, on flickr.com
Report on a survey of the tower, prior to demolition, with plan

Shot towers
Towers completed in 1782
Towers in Bristol
Buildings and structures demolished in 1968
1782 establishments in England
Demolished buildings and structures in Bristol